The sixth season of the American television drama series Homeland premiered on January 15, 2017, and concluded on April 9, 2017, on Showtime, consisting of 12 episodes. The series started as a loosely based variation of the two-season run of the Israeli television series Hatufim (English: Prisoners of War) created by Gideon Raff and is developed for American television by Howard Gordon and Alex Gansa. The sixth season was released on Blu-ray and DVD on February 6, 2018.

Plot
Set several months after her actions prevent a sarin attack in Berlin, Carrie Mathison is back in the United States, living in Brooklyn, New York with her young pre-school aged daughter. She works for a nonprofit organization providing aid to local U.S Muslims. Alive, but now disabled, Peter Quinn lives with the fallout of a major stroke and PTSD. Dar Adal and Saul Berenson continue to work for the CIA, dealing with United States counterterrorism initiatives.

The season is set around the imminent election of the United States' first female president, Senator Elizabeth Keane, and takes place between her election day and inauguration day. The season deals with a suspected cover-up of a terror plot, and the Joint Comprehensive Plan of Action.

Cast and characters

Main

 Claire Danes as Carrie Mathison, now working at a foundation for Muslims mistreated by domestic law enforcement in New York
 Rupert Friend as Peter Quinn, a former CIA SAD/SOG (black ops) operative recovering from sarin poisoning
 Elizabeth Marvel as Elizabeth Keane, a junior senator from New York, elected as the President of United States
 F. Murray Abraham as Dar Adal, a CIA official and black ops specialist
 Mandy Patinkin as Saul Berenson, a CIA official and Carrie's former boss and mentor

Recurring
 Hill Harper as Rob Emmons, the White House Chief of Staff designate to President-elect Keane
 Robert Knepper as General Jamie McClendon, the Department of Defense representative briefing President-elect Keane and her transition team
 Dominic Fumusa as FBI Special Agent Ray Conlin
 Patrick Sabongui as Reda Hashem, CUNY School of Law professor and lawyer to the Muslim-American community
 Zainab Jah as Aby Bah, Sekou's mother
 J. Mallory McCree as Sekou Bah, a Muslim man suspected of radicalization and a client of Carrie's
 Ashlei Sharpe Chestnut as Simone Bah, Sekou's sister
 Leo Manzari as Saad Mahsud, Sekou's friend and an FBI informant
 Mickey O'Hagan as Clarice, a prostitute and Quinn's friend
 Claire and McKenna Keane as Frances "Franny" Mathison, Carrie's daughter
 Maury Sterling as Max Piotrowski, a freelance surveillance expert
 C.J. Wilson as Porteous Belli, a mercenary
 Bernard White as Farhad Nafisi, a mysterious financier associated with Iran and the IRGC
 James Mount as Secret Service Agent Thoms, President-elect Keane's head of security
 Shaun Toub as Majid Javadi, an IRGC general and CIA asset
 Jake Weber as Brett O’Keefe, TV host and provocateur
 Seth Numrich as Nate Joseph, a CIA analyst/technician
 Nina Hoss as Astrid, a German Intelligence officer working for the BND
 Marin Hinkle as Christine Lonas, a youth care social worker
 David Thornton as George Pallis, Solicitor General of the United States

Guest

 Hadar Ratzon-Rotem as Tova Rivlin, a Mossad agent
 Alfredo Narciso as Senator Elian Coto
 Bobby Moreno as Tommy
 Sebastian Koch as Otto Düring, a German philanthropist
 Jacqueline Antaramian as Dorit
 Ian Kahn as Roger
 Allan Corduner as Etai Luskin, a Mossad agent
 Deborah Hedwall as Marjorie Diehl
 Robert Bogue as E.S.U. Captain Wilson
 Rachel Ticotin as Mercedes, New York CIA Station Chief
 Alan Dale as President Morse
 Ronald Guttman as Viktor
 Anthony Azizi as Naser
 Martha Raddatz as herself
 Orlagh Cassidy as Rachel Crofts
 Chris Coy as Rudy
 Lesli Margherita as Sharon Aldright
 David Adkins as Dr. Schouten
 Bradford Anderson as Trent
 Sarita Choudhury as Mira Berenson, Saul's ex-wife
 Erin Darke as Nicki
 Dov Tiefenbach as The Jeweler
 Julee Cerda as Reiko Umon
 Linus Roache as David Wellington, President's Chief of Staff
 John Getz as Joe Crocker
 Philip Casnoff as Christopher

Episodes

Production

The season's episodes’ opening includes excerpts from The Revolution Will Not Be Televised.

Development
On December 9, 2015, the series was renewed for a sixth season. On August 11, 2016, at the 2016 Summer TCA Press Tour it was announced that filming of the season would begin in August 2016 in New York City. Showrunners Alex Gansa and Howard Gordon along with Gideon Raff, Chip Johannessen, Michael Klick, Patrick Harbinson, Lesli Linka Glatter, Avi Nir, Ran Telem, and Claire Danes are executive producers.

In September 2016, co-star Rupert Friend sustained an injury to his foot, forcing production to shoot around his character Peter Quinn. Also announced that month was that the production would return to film scenes in Morocco (subbing for Abu Dhabi and Israel), where the series had not filmed since its third season. A promotional poster and a behind-the-scenes video was released on November 17, 2016.

Casting
On July 27, 2016, Elizabeth Marvel was cast in the role of Elizabeth Keane, a senator from New York who was just elected to be the next President of the United States. On August 10, 2016, it was announced that Hill Harper and Patrick Sabongui joined the cast. On August 16, 2016, Robert Knepper joined the cast in the recurring role of General Jamie McClendon, the Department of Defense representative. On September 10, 2016, it was announced that Dominic Fumusa had joined as FBI Special Agent Ray Conlin.

Reception

Critical reception
The sixth season of Homeland received mixed to positive reviews from critics. On Metacritic, the season has a score of 68 out of 100 based on 15 reviews. On Rotten Tomatoes, it has an approval rating of 78% with an average rating of 7.32 out of 10 based on 28 reviews. The site's critical consensus is, "Homeland delivers introspective comfort food with a satisfyingly strong leading female character and storylines that continue to surprise."

Accolades
For the 69th Primetime Emmy Awards, the series received three nominations–Mandy Patinkin for Outstanding Supporting Actor in a Drama Series, Lesli Linka Glatter for Outstanding Directing for a Drama Series for "America First", and Outstanding Sound Editing for a Series for "America First". This is the first season in which Claire Danes has not been nominated for Outstanding Lead Actress in a Drama Series.

References

External links

 
 

2017 American television seasons
6
Brooklyn in fiction